Barra, traditionally known as Niumi, is a city in The Gambia, located in the district of Lower Niumi. The predominant languages of the city are Serer and Wolof.

Although Mandinka-speaking Africans always referred to the state along the north bank of the Gambia River's estuary as Niumi, not everyone did. For a long time it was called "Barra" in the creolized trade language of the river, and between the seventeenth and nineteenth centuries British and French records use "Barra" or "Bar" more frequently than "Niumi".

See also
 Niumi National Park

References

Lower Niumi
Populated places in the Gambia
Gambia River
Serer country